John Hickman (October 7, 1942 – May 11, 2021) was an American five-string banjo player.

Hickman was born in Columbus, Ohio. He started playing the banjo at the age of 13.

In 1969, he moved to California, and began performing together with fiddle player Byron Berline and guitarist Dan Crary.

He released the album Don’t Mean Maybe in 1978.

References

Further reading
Trischka, Tony, and Pete Wernick. 2000. Masters of the 5-string Banjo: In Their Own Words and Music. Oak Publications. 

1942 births
2021 deaths
American banjoists
American bluegrass musicians
American folk musicians
Musicians from Columbus, Ohio
Musicians from Los Angeles
People from Hilliard, Ohio
Country musicians from California
Country musicians from Ohio